Pennsylvania Route 861 (PA 861) is a  state highway located in Clarion County in Pennsylvania.  The western terminus is at PA 68 in Rimersburg.  The eastern terminus is at PA 66 in New Bethlehem.

Route description

PA 861 begins at an intersection with PA 68 in the borough of Rimersburg, heading southeast on a two-lane undivided road. The route heads into Toby Township and runs through forests, soon crossing into Madison Township. The road curves south, passing through Diamond before making a turn to the east and continuing into agricultural areas. PA 861 enters Porter Township and continues east through a mix of farmland and woodland with occasional homes. The route heads to the southeast through more rural areas before curving east and heading into the borough of New Bethlehem. At this point, the PA 861 becomes Penn Street and passes homes, ending at an intersection with PA 66.

Major intersections

See also

References

External links

Pennsylvania Highways: PA 861

Transportation in Clarion County, Pennsylvania
861